Catherine of Saxe-Lauenburg (born: circa 1400; died: 22 September 1450), was a Baroness consort of Werle-Güstrow, a Duchess consort of Mecklenburg, and Regent of the Duchy of Mecklenburg from 1422 to 1436 as the guardian of her under age sons.

Life
Catherine was the daughter of Eric IV and Sophia of Brunswick-Lüneburg.  She married firstly, John VII of Werle.  He died in 1414.  She then married the Duke John IV of Mecklenburg in 1416.   When John died in 1422, after six years of marriage, she ruled until 1436 as Regent for her minor sons.

For a long time, a charter date July 1448 was the last known document to name Catherine.  Then a charter surfaced which suggested she died in November.  Around the turn of the Century, Hans Witte could finally prove she died on St. Maurice day (22 September) 1450.

Issue 
From her marriage with John, Catherine had two sons:
 Henry IV the Fat, Duke of Mecklenburg (1417 to 1477)
 John V, Duke of Mecklenburg (1418–1442)

External links 
 References about Catherine of Saxe-Lauenburg in the Landesbibliographie Mecklenburg-Vorpommern
 Biographical data of Catherine
 Genealogical table of the House of Mecklenburg

Duchesses of Mecklenburg
1450 deaths
Year of birth uncertain
15th-century women rulers
Daughters of monarchs